Yuzhno-Kurilsky District is an administrative district (raion) of Sakhalin Oblast, Russia; one of the seventeen in the oblast. Municipally, it is incorporated as Yuzhno-Kurilsky Urban Okrug. It is located on the southern Kuril Islands southeast of the Island of Sakhalin, comprising the islands of Kunashir, Shikotan, and the Habomai. Its administrative center is the urban locality (an urban-type settlement) of Yuzhno-Kurilsk, located on Kunashir Island. Population:  The population of Yuzhno-Kurilsk accounts for 61.4% of the district's total population.

Dispute with Japan

The district in its entirety, along with the nearby island of Iturup in the Kurilsky District, are claimed by Japan as part of the Nemuro Subprefecture of Hokkaidō.

References

Notes

Sources

Districts of Sakhalin Oblast